During April 25–28, 2011, the local weather forecast offices of the National Weather Service confirmed 359 tornadoes in the United States, and Environment Canada confirmed another in Ontario. These tornadoes were part of a major outbreak of tornadoes, the 2011 Super Outbreak, in which 360 tornadoes touched down across 21 states in the Southern, Midwestern, and Northeastern United States and in Ontario, Canada.

As the outbreak developed on April 25, numerous tornadoes touched down across Texas and Arkansas, including an EF3 tornado near Hot Springs Village, Arkansas that caused significant damage and killed one person and a long-track EF2 tornado in the Vilonia, Arkansas area that killed four people and injured 16 others while staying down for over an hour.

April 26 saw mostly weaker tornadoes and no fatalities, with the notable tornadoes of the day being an EF2 tornado that tracked across parts of Texas and into Louisiana and a brief EF3 tornado that struck Campbell Army Airfield, causing $1 million (2011 USD) in damage. From the 27th to early on the 28th, a series of devastating, long-tracked, violent tornadoes killed over 300 people throughout an area extending from Mississippi to Virginia. This included eleven tornadoes rated EF4 and four rated EF5. One particularly devastating and long-lived EF5 wedge tornado tore across northern Alabama and into Tennessee, killing 72 people and devastating several small towns, particularly Hackleburg, Phil Campbell, Tanner, and Harvest. A large, long-tracked EF4 wedge tornado was broadcast live on multiple TV stations as it caused catastrophic damage in densely populated areas of Tuscaloosa and Birmingham, Alabama, killing 64 people. 

Numerous other small towns including Smithville, Mississippi; Cordova, Alabama; Rainsville, Alabama; Ohatchee, Alabama; Cullman, Alabama; Trenton, Georgia; Ringgold, Georgia; Apison, Tennessee; and Glade Spring, Virginia sustained devastating, direct hits from intense tornadoes, with several producing death tolls well into the double digits. 319 additional tornado-related deaths occurred within those two days before the outbreak came to an end, bringing the total death toll to 324 from 31 separate tornadoes; 24 other fatalities occurred from separate thunderstorm impacts.

The period from 2:28 p.m. CDT (1928 UTC) to 9:10 p.m. CDT (0210 UTC) represented nearly seven hours of continuous tornado activity during the height of the outbreak of April 27, during which 94 tornadoes touched down. All fifteen violent EF4+ tornadoes occurred continuously during this time, beginning with the Philadelphia, Mississippi EF5 tornado at 2:30 p.m. CDT (1930 UTC) and concluding with the dissipation of the Lake Martin/Dadeville EF4 tornado at 9:09 p.m. CDT (0209 UTC). Several tornadoes from the outbreak were exceptionally long-tracked. Seven tornadoes–the Vilonia tornado on April 25 and six tornadoes on April 27–stayed on the ground for over an hour. The long-track Mississippi–Alabama EF4 tornado was down from 2 hours, 53 minutes, the longest duration for a tornado in the outbreak.

The outbreak continued during the overnight and into the morning of April 28, with 47 more tornadoes occurring from Florida to New York. Most of the tornadoes very relatively weak and caused comparatively minor damage. Much of the tornado activity ceased by mid-morning, with only ten tornadoes occurring during the afternoon as the outbreak came to an end.

Confirmed tornadoes

April 25 event

April 26 event

April 27 event

* – One tornado touched down in Ontario, Canada and was rated as an F0. It is counted as an EF0 in this table.

April 28 event

See also
Tornadoes of 2011
2011 Super Outbreak
List of United States tornadoes in April 2011
List of tornadoes in the tornado outbreak of April 14–16, 2011
List of tornadoes in the 1974 Super Outbreak
List of F5 and EF5 tornadoes
List of tornadoes and tornado outbreaks

Notes

References

2011-04-25
 04
Tornado,2011-04-25
2011-related lists
Tornado,2011-04-25